Simon Watson is an Irish portrait, interior, and travel photographer.

Biography
Simon Watson is a native of Dublin, Ireland, currently living and working in New York for the past twenty-five years. He studied film in Dublin and experimented with other forms of visual art including painting before concentrating on photography. He now lives between New York and Dublin.

In 1998 he began work on more emotional-based projects, including a series of photographs of the interiors of houses, offices, and schools in New Orleans after Hurricane Katrina. In 2006 Watson was granted access to areas of the Holocaust concentration camp Auschwitz, which had remained unseen since 1945. His exhibition at the museum in 2007 was widely received.

Career
His work appears regularly in numerous editorial publications such as T Magazine, W Magazine, Vanity Fair Spain, Travel + Leisure, Italian Grazia Casa and House & Garden. His advertising client list includes Marriott, JP Morgan Chase, Visa, MasterCard, Morgan Stanley, MetLife, AT&T, Holland America, Hyatt, American Express, and IBM.

He has shown his work in solo and group exhibitions in the US and Europe, including solo shows at Richard Anderson Fine Art in New York and the Auschwitz Museum in Poland. His work is included in museum, public, private and corporate collections in the US and Europe.
In June 2013 he had his first solo show of paintings at the Gallerie Rideau de Fer-Castlefranc in Lot, France.

References

External links
Simon Watson’s website

Irish photographers
Living people
Year of birth missing (living people)